Never Mind the Breeze Blocks is the second and final album by the animated Neil Morrissey-voiced Bob the Builder character from the BBC television series of the same name. A mixture of cover versions and songs written and produced by Keith Hopwood, who scored the TV series from 2004 to 2011. It was released in the year 2008 by Universal Music, and spawned one single "Big Fish Little Fish". Many of the songs featured on the album are parodies of popular songs, such as "Working in Sunshine" is Katrina and the Waves' "Walking on Sunshine", "I'm Gonna Be (500 Miles)" is a parody of the song with the same name performed by The Proclaimers, "Hey, Wendy" is "Hey, Baby" by DJ Ötzi and "(Is This The Way To) Sunflower Valley" is performed to the much-loved tune of Tony Christie's "(Is This The Way To) Amarillo". The album title itself is a parody of the Sex Pistols' 1977 album Never Mind The Bollocks. In Australia, the album was released under the title Appetite For Construction, a parody of Guns N' Roses' 1987 album Appetite For Destruction.

Track listing 
 "Working In Sunshine" (4:05)
 "Hey, Wendy" (3:27)
 "Big Fish Little Fish" (3:40)
 "Nuts and Bolts and Nails and Screws" (3:11)
 "Down On The Farm" (3:08)
 "Halfway Down The Hill" (2:23)
 "Picking Up The Pieces" (3:32)
 "Bend It, Shape It" (3:23)
 "(Is This The Way To) Sunflower Valley"  (3:21)
 "Digging It Up" (3:01)
 "(I'm Gonna Be) 500 Miles" (3:32)
 "No Hats, No Boots, No Job"  (3:06)
 "Can We Fix It? (Bob the Builder Theme Song)"  (3:07)

"Big Fish Little Fish" 

"Big Fish Little Fish" was the single released by Bob the Builder from the Never Mind the Breeze Blocks. It was released in November 2008 in the United Kingdom, where it charted at number 81 in the UK Singles Chart.

It is the third song released by the character. Neil Morrissey, who voiced the character, again sings in the song.

Track listing 
 "Big Fish Little Fish" (Radio Edit) [2:43]
 "Big Fish Little Fish" (Album Version) [3:45]
 "Big Fish Little Fish" (Video) [4:00]

Charts

References

2008 albums
Bob the Builder albums